"Like It Is" is a song by Norwegian DJ Kygo, Swedish singer Zara Larsson and American rapper Tyga. It was released through Sony Music on 27 March 2020 as the second single from Kygo's third studio album Golden Hour.

Background
The song was originally written by English singer Dua Lipa and Ritual member Gerard O' Connell for her debut album. A snippet first appeared on her Instagram on 16 May 2019, with the full song leaking on May 26. The song was bought by Kygo after the leak, who invited Zara Larsson and Tyga to collaborate on the track.

Kygo announced on social media on 24 March 2020 that his third studio album was finished, and that the lead single would be out on Friday of that week. Kygo also talked about spending time at home due to the COVID-19 pandemic and "staying positive in these tough times"; Dancing Astronaut felt that Kygo's announcement came at a time when those in self-quarantine are "hoping to bring some light during these dark quarantine days".

Critical reception
Farrell Sweeney of Dancing Astronaut wrote that the song features "enamoring vocals by Larsson, immediately pulling the listener into the catchy commercial fabric" of the song. Sweeney also felt that Tyga's rap verse after the first drop was "surprising" and gave the song an "unexpected twist".

Music video
The video was released on 27 March 2020, and features Larsson and Tyga in an apartment building. It was called an "artistic and colorful visual accompaniment" by Sweeney.

Charts

Weekly charts

Year-end charts

Certifications

References

2020 singles
2020 songs
Kygo songs
Tyga songs
Zara Larsson songs
Song recordings produced by Kygo
Songs written by Kygo
Songs written by Dua Lipa
Songs written by Nick Hodgson
Songs written by Zara Larsson
Songs written by Tyga